The 2022 Australian Swimming Championships were held from 18 to 22 May 2022 at the South Australia Aquatic and Leisure Centre in Adelaide, South Australia.

Originally scheduled for April, the meet was pushed back to May after the announcement of the 2022 FINA World Championships in Budapest, Hungary scheduled for June 2022. This event doubled up as the national trials for the FINA World Championships, as well as the Birmingham 2022 Commonwealth Games.

Emma McKeon chose to miss this meet as under a new rule from Swimming Australia, McKeon was pre-selected for the 2022 Commonwealth Games after her successful 2021 Olympics campaign.

During the Day 1 finals session, Cody Simpson finished third behind Matthew Temple and Kyle Chalmers. It was initially thought Simpson had qualified for the World Aquatics Championships as Chalmers was not going to swim, however Chalmers backflipped on his decision which ultimately pushed Simpson out of the team.

Schedule

M = Morning session, E = Evening session

Medal winners
The medallist for the open events are below.

Men's events

Women's events

Mixed events

Legend:

Records broken
During the 2022 Australian Swimming Championships the following records were set.

All Comers and Championship records

Club points scores
The final club point scores are below. Note: Only the top ten clubs are listed.

Broadcast

References

Swimming Championships
Australian championships
Australian Swimming Championships
Sports competitions in Adelaide
Australian Swimming Championships